Menemerus davidi is a jumping spider species in the genus Menemerus that lives in North Africa, Israel and Jordan.

References

Salticidae
Spiders of Africa
Spiders of Asia
Spiders described in 1999
Taxa named by Wanda Wesołowska